The 1976 Green Bay Packers season was their 58th season overall and their 56th season in the National Football League. The team finished with a 5–9 record under coach Bart Starr, earning them a fourth-place finish in the NFC Central division. The Packers struggled, and finished in last place in the NFC Central with a 5-9 record, as the Quarterback position began to resemble a revolving door, as Lynn Dickey became the latest young Quarterback to struggle with Interceptions.

Offseason

1976 Expansion Draft

NFL draft

Roster

Regular season

Schedule 

Note: Intra-division opponents are in bold text.

Standings

Season summary

Week 4 vs Lions

Awards and records

References 

 Sportsencyclopedia.com

Green Bay Packers seasons
Green Bay Packers
Green